Wallace Doroin  Francis (born November 7, 1951) is a former professional American football wide receiver who played 9 years in the National Football League (NFL) for the Buffalo Bills and the Atlanta Falcons from 1973 to 1981.

Francis played college football at the University of Arkansas at Pine Bluff.

References

1951 births
Living people
People from Franklin, Louisiana
Players of American football from Louisiana
American football wide receivers
Arkansas–Pine Bluff Golden Lions football players
Buffalo Bills players
Atlanta Falcons players